Denticularia is a genus of ascomycete fungus. Its species are typically plant pathogens. Its taxonomy is unclear. It has been suggested to belong among the Mycosphaerellaceae, but this has not been proven. It is tentatively retained as a genus, awaiting further investigation via molecular sequencing.

Species  
 Denticularia fici  
 Denticularia hachijoensis
 Denticularia limoniformis
 Denticularia mangiferae
 Denticularia modesta
 Denticularia terminaliae
 Denticularia tertia

References

External links 
 Index Fungorum

Fungal plant pathogens and diseases
Ascomycota enigmatic taxa